Cambo-les-Bains or Kanbo Geltokia is a railway station in Cambo-les-Bains, Nouvelle-Aquitaine, France. The station was opened in 1891 and is located on the Bayonne - Saint-Jean-Pied-de-Port railway line. The station is served by TER (local) services operated by the SNCF.

Train services
The following services currently call at Cambo-les-Bains:
local service (TER Nouvelle-Aquitaine) Bayonne - Saint-Jean-Pied-de-Port

References

Railway stations in France opened in 1891
Railway stations in Pyrénées-Atlantiques